Archimandrite Ephraim (Moraitis, also known as Ephraim of Philotheos, Greek: Εφραίμ Φιλοθεΐτης and Ephraim of Arizona, Greek: Εφραίμ Αριζόνας). (June 24, 1928, Volos, Thessaly, Greece – December 7, 2019, St. Anthony Monastery, Arizona, USA) was a Greek clergyman of the American Archdiocese of the Orthodox Church of Constantinople.

Early life and background
On June 24, 1928, he was born Ioannis Moraitis in Volos, Greece. His parents were Demetrios and Victoria Moraitis.

Ephraim moved to Mount Athos in 1947, where he was a disciple of the Athonite elder St. Joseph the Hesychast. On July 13, 1948, he was tonsured and given the monastic name Ephraim. When his spiritual master Joseph the Hesychast died on August 15, 1959, he became the geronda (elder) of the hut of Annunciation of the Theotokos in New Skete. Ephraim soon became the head of his own brotherhood (which grew to 80 monks in 1981) and moved with them to the skete of Provata in 1968. From October 1, 1973, to 1991, Ephraim served as the abbot of Philotheou Monastery. Through the efforts of Archimandrite Ephrem, monastic life was restored in several sketes on Mount Athos, as his disciples also repopulated the monasteries of Philotheou, Xeropotamou, Konstamonitou, and Karakallou.

In 1979, Ephrem visited North American cities and met with members of the Greek diaspora.

First he visited parishes in Canada (Toronto, Vancouver, Montreal). Afterwards, people started inviting him to the US. Similar visits have become regular in the United States and Canada. Finally, Archimandrite Ephraim decided to move to the United States for the spiritual nourishment of the flock and for the revival of spiritual life in the Greek communities of North America.

Missionary work in the US and Canada

Archimandrite Ephraim devoted his entire life to missionary work, which was based on the opening of Orthodox monasteries in the United States and Canada, which soon became spiritual centers. The first monastery was founded in 1989 (the convent of the Nativity of the Virgin Mary in Pittsburgh, Pennsylvania). In 1995, Archimandrite Ephrem founded the now-famous monastery in the Sonoran Desert of Arizona in honor of Anthony the Great, where he settled. Totally 19 monasteries were established in the United States and Canada as a result of his work.
 
The Greek Orthodox monasteries in North America founded by Ephraim of Arizona are:

Archimandrite Ephraim died at St. Anthony Monastery, Arizona, on December 7, 2019, at the age of 91.

References

External links
 Η Εις Κύριον Εκδημία του Γέροντος Εφραίμ - 2019 - Greek Orthodox Archdiocese of America
 Pravoslavie.ru 
 St. Anthony's Monastery

1928 births
2019 deaths
Greek Orthodox Archdiocese of America
Greek Eastern Orthodox priests
Christian missionaries
People from Volos
Archimandrites
Greek emigrants to the United States
People from Florence, Arizona
People associated with Mount Athos
People associated with Philotheou Monastery
Disciples of Joseph the Hesychast